The 1961 New Hampshire Wildcats football team was an American football team that represented the University of New Hampshire as a member of the Yankee Conference during the 1961 NCAA College Division football season. In its 13th year under head coach Chief Boston, the team compiled a 3–5 record (1–3 against conference opponents) and finished fourth out of six teams in the Yankee Conference.

Schedule

References

New Hampshire
New Hampshire Wildcats football seasons
New Hampshire Wildcats football